The 2001 season marked the tenth year of competitive football in the Baltic country since its independence. The Estonia national football team played thirteen matches and ranked fourth place overall.

Egypt vs Estonia

Cyprus vs Estonia

Moldova vs Estonia

Estonia vs Finland

Estonia vs Netherlands

Estonia vs Ireland

Latvia vs Estonia

Lithuania vs Estonia

Estonia vs Cyprus

Netherlands vs Estonia

Portugal vs Estonia

Greece vs Estonia

Estonia vs Kazakhstan

Notes

References
 RSSSF detailed results January - June
 RSSSF detailed results July - December

2001
2001 national football team results
National